Year 298 (CCXCVIII) was a common year starting on Saturday (link will display the full calendar) of the Julian calendar. At the time, it was known as the Year of the Consulship of Faustus and Gallus (or, less frequently, year 1051 Ab urbe condita). The denomination 298 for this year has been used since the early medieval period, when the Anno Domini calendar era became the prevalent method in Europe for naming years.

Events 
 By place 

 Roman Empire 
 Spring: Emperor Diocletian retakes Alexandria and crushes the usurpation of Aurelius Achilleus. 
 Diocletian then travels into Upper Egypt and possibly campaigns on the Nubian frontier. In either this year or in 300/301, he makes agreements with the Meroitic Nubians and the Blemmyes. He agrees to pay subsidies to both peoples, and he cedes the Dodecashoenos to the Nubians on the understanding that the Nubians will defend the region against the Blemmyes.
 Caesar Galerius restores Tiridates III to the throne of Armenia and invades the Sassanid Empire. His army marches through Adiabene, Atropatene, Susiana and Lower Mesopotamia. He then retakes the strategically important city of Nisibis in Upper Mesopotamia.

 Korea 
 The manufacture of cultured silk becomes popular from Korea to Japan.
 Bunseo becomes king of the Korean kingdom of Baekje.
 Girim becomes the king of the Korean kingdom of Silla.

Births 
 Athanasius of Alexandria, Egyptian patriarch (d. 373)

Deaths 
 Aurelius Achilleus, Roman usurper
 Cassian of Tangier, Christian martyr
 Chaekgye of Baekje, Korean ruler 
 Marcellus of Tangier, Christian martyr
 Yurye of Silla (or Yuri), Korean ruler

References